David Randall Thom (born August 21, 1951) is an American sound designer and the current director of sound design at Skywalker Sound.

Career
Randy Thom began working at FM radio station WYSO at Antioch College in Yellow Springs, Ohio as a volunteer in 1970. After two years he became the station's Program Director, produced a live music show he called “Live Music Crawlin’ Out Your Radio,” and did pieces for NPR’s “All Things Considered.”

In 1975 he moved to Berkeley, California and began working with Erik Bauersfeld at KPFA Radio producing radio plays.

Thom started his film career with a phone call to Walter Murch, who invited him to visit a re-mix of American Graffiti. Thom introduced himself to Walter Murch, Ben Burtt, and Mark Berger, and said he had been working for a radio station in Berkeley, and wanted to work in film sound."

At the end of the day Murch asked him to write an essay about what he had seen during the visit.  A few weeks later Murch hired Randy to work on Apocalypse Now. His second film sound job would prove to be a strong turn in his career, as he assisted Ben Burtt in the Sound Effects Recording for The Empire Strikes Back.

In February 2010, Thom was honored with the Cinema Audio Society Career Achievement Award. The Award was presented by Thom's long time client and friend, Robert Zemeckis.

Thom received the prestigious MPSE Career Achievement Award at the 2014 Golden Reel Awards Gala in Los Angeles. The Award was presented by George Lucas.

Thom has been nominated for fifteen Oscars and has received two.  One for “The Right Stuff,” and one for “The Incredibles.  He has also received a British Academy Award for “The Revenant,” and a French Academy Award for “Le Chant de Loup.”

Filmography

Awards

Academy Awards
 2005 – Best Sound Editing, The Incredibles
 1984 – Best Sound, The Right Stuff

Nominations
 2016 – Best Sound Mixing, The Revenant
 2008 – Best Sound, Ratatouille
 2008 – Best Sound Editing, Ratatouille
 2005 – Best Sound Editing, The Polar Express
 2005 – Best Sound Mixing, The Polar Express
 2005 – Best Sound Mixing, The Incredibles
 2001 – Best Sound Mixing, Cast Away
 1998 – Best Sound Mixing, Contact
 1995 – Best Sound Effects Editing, Forrest Gump
 1995 – Best Sound, Forrest Gump
 1992 – Best Sound, Backdraft
 1984 – Best Sound, Never Cry Wolf
 1984 – Best Sound, Return of the Jedi

British Academy Film Awards (BAFTA)
2016 - Best Sound, The Revenant

French Academy Awards (César)
2020 - Best Sound, The Wolf's Call

Honorary awards
 2010 Cinema Audio Society Career Achievement Honoree.
2014 Motion Picture Sound Editors Career Achievement Honoree
Honorary Doctorate from the University of Edinburgh, Scotland

References

External links
 Randy Thom at Skywalker Sound
 
 https://randythomblog.wordpress.com/ (Randy Thom's blog)

1951 births
Living people
American sound editors
Animal impersonators
Best Sound BAFTA Award winners
Best Sound Editing Academy Award winners
Best Sound Mixing Academy Award winners
CAS Career Achievement Award honorees
Lucasfilm people
People from Shreveport, Louisiana
Pixar people
American sound designers
Blue Sky Studios people